"Nowhere Man" is a song by the English rock band the Beatles. It was released in December 1965 on their album Rubber Soul, except in the United States and Canada, where it was first issued as a single A-side in February 1966 before appearing on the album Yesterday and Today. The song was written by John Lennon and credited to the Lennon–McCartney partnership. In the US, the single peaked at number 3 on the Billboard Hot 100 and number 1 on the chart compiled by Record World magazine, as it did the RPM 100 chart in Canada and in Australia. The song was also released as a single in some countries where it had been included on Rubber Soul, including Australia, where it topped the singles chart.

Recorded on 21 and 22 October 1965, "Nowhere Man" describes a man with no direction in his life and with no genuine worldview. It is one of the first Beatles songs to be entirely unrelated to romance or love, and marks a notable example of Lennon's philosophically oriented songwriting. Lennon, Paul McCartney and George Harrison sing the song in three-part harmony. The lead guitar solo was performed in unison by Harrison and Lennon. The pair played identical "sonic blue"-coloured Fender Stratocasters on the track. The song appears in the film Yellow Submarine, where the Beatles sing it about the character Jeremy Hillary Boob after meeting him in the "nowhere land".

Background
Lennon wrote the song about himself after racking his brain in desperation for five hours trying to come up with another song for Rubber Soul. Lennon told Playboy magazine:

McCartney said of the song:

Musical structure

The song as a whole is a 32-bar form, following the standard model of the Tin-pan Alley chorus, with a repeating 8-bar primary statement outlining the E-major chord, a third phrase (bars 17–42) forming a musical question (concluding on the dominant B), and a fourth phrase recapitulating the initial statement in E major. The primary statement begins with the chord of E (I tonic) on "He's a real" and then involves a 5–4–3–2–1 pitch descent between the B (V dominant) chord on "nowhere man" and A (IV subdominant) chord on "sitting in"; a twist comes where Am (iv minor) replaces A in the final line ("nowhere plans") and the simultaneous G note melody creates a dissonant AmM7. The bridge (a standard third-phrase "B" in the AABA form), which appears three times, seesaws on a G minor/A major (iii–IV) sequence before falling back on an F minor and leading back to the verse on a B7, as is typical of "Tin-pan alley" standard B sections.

Cover versions
A ukulele version of "Nowhere Man" by Tiny Tim was Harrison's contribution to the Beatles' 1968 Christmas record. Distributed to members of the Beatles' fan club, the record differed from the band's previous Christmas records by including separate contributions from the four bandmates, reflecting the disharmony within the group at the time. Beatles historian John Winn describes Tim's version as the "highlight of the disc" and a "timeless" interpretation.

The song has attracted many other cover versions, including recordings in the synth-pop style by Gershon Kingsley, glam metal by Dokken and easy listening by Yanni. In his book on the legacy of Rubber Soul, John Kruth expresses disappointment in the Carpenters' version, which was recorded in 1968 and released in 2001, following singer Karen Carpenter's death (she died in 1983), with a "ludicrous" overdubbed string arrangement. He highlights a "down-home take" by Randy Travis for the 1995 Come Together Beatles tribute album for its "sweet cascading pedal steel riff", and Replacements vocalist Paul Westerberg's acoustic rendering in the 2001 film I Am Sam for transforming the song into a "regretful lullaby". He also recognises former Ramones drummer Marky Ramone as the artist who provided the "balls-to-the-wall version", saying that in Ramone's 1999 cover, he "spits and sprays Lennon's lyrics while guitars slash and grind".

Personnel
According to Ian MacDonald, the line-up on the Beatles' recording was:
John Lennon – double-tracked lead vocal, acoustic rhythm guitar, lead guitar 
Paul McCartney – bass guitar, harmony vocal
George Harrison – lead guitar, harmony vocal
Ringo Starr – drums

Charts and certifications

Weekly charts

Certifications

References

Sources

 
 
 
 
 
 
 
Turner, Steve. A Hard Day's Write: The Stories Behind Every Beatles' Song, Harper, New York: 1994,

External links
 

1965 songs
1966 singles
The Beatles songs
Capitol Records singles
Parlophone singles
Songs written by Lennon–McCartney
Song recordings produced by George Martin
Songs published by Northern Songs
RPM Top Singles number-one singles
The Carpenters songs
Songs about loneliness
British folk rock songs